Soy Como Quiero Ser is the fifth studio album recorded by Mexican singer Luis Miguel and his first album to be released by WEA Latina on July 15, 1987 (see 1987 in music). The album was subtitled "Luis Miguel '87: Soy Como Quiero Ser". The singers Laura Branigan and Rocío Banquells appear on two of the album's tracks. The majority of the songs included are covers from the 1960s, 1970s and 1980s. In 1988, Soy Como Quiero Ser received a nomination for a Grammy Award for Best Latin Pop Album in the 30th Annual Grammy Awards, losing to Un Hombre Solo by Julio Iglesias.

Track listing

Portuguese version
A Portuguese version was released in 1988 and is referred to as Luis Miguel '88 instead of '87. It was released as a vinyl LP and on Cassette only.

Side A
Es Mejor
Sin Hablar
Agora Você Pode Ir (Ahora Te Puedes Marchar)
Eu Que Não Vivo Sem Você (Yo Que No Vivo Sin Tí)
Era Você (Eres Tú)
Solo Tu
Side B
No Me Puedo Escapar de Ti
Cuando Calienta El Sol
Soy Como Quiero Ser
Perdoname
Sunny

Chart performance in United States

Sales and certifications

Personnel
 Producer: Juan Carlos Calderón
 Executive Production: Luisito Rey
 Arrangements on "Sin Hablar", "Cuando Calienta el Sol", "Sólo Tú" and "Yo Que No Vivo Sin Tí" by Juan Carlos Calderón
 Arrangements on "No Me Puedo Escapar De Tí", "Ahora Te Puedes Marchar" and "Eres Tú" by K. C. Porter
 Arrangements on "Es Mejor" and "Sunny" by: Randy Kerber
 Arrangements on: "Perdóname" and "Soy Como Quiero Ser" by Erich Bulling.
 Bass: Dennis Bellfield
 Drums: Carlos Vega and Paul Leim
 Guitars: Dan Huff and Paul Jackson Jr.
 Keyboards: Randy Kerber, Juan Carlos Calderón and K. C. Porter
 Percussions: Paulinho DaCosta
 Piano: Randy Kerber
 Saxo solos: Joel Peskin
 Strings: Ezra Kilger
 Metals on "Es Mejor": Jerry Hey, Mark Russo, Bill Richenbach and Gary Grant.
 Metals on "Cuando Calienta El Sol": Burnette Dillon, Charles Davis, Jim sawyer and Joseph Johnson
 Background vocals: Tony DeFranco, K. C. Porter, Isela Sotelo and Darlene Kolden-Hoven
 Photography: Randee St. Nicholas

See also
 List of best-selling albums in Mexico
 List of best-selling Latin albums

References

1987 albums
Luis Miguel albums
Warner Music Latina albums
Spanish-language albums
Albums produced by Juan Carlos Calderón